In particle physics, a Grand Unified Theory (GUT) is a model in which, at high energies, the three gauge interactions of the Standard Model comprising the electromagnetic, weak, and strong forces are merged into a single force. Although this unified force has not been directly observed, many GUT models theorize its existence. If unification of these three interactions is possible, it raises the possibility that there was a grand unification epoch in the very early universe in which these three fundamental interactions were not yet distinct.

Experiments have confirmed that at high energy the electromagnetic interaction and weak interaction unify into a single combined electroweak interaction. GUT models predict that at even higher energy, the strong interaction and the electroweak interaction will unify into one electronuclear interaction. This interaction is characterized by one larger gauge symmetry and thus several force carriers, but one unified coupling constant. Unifying gravity with the electronuclear interaction would provide a more comprehensive theory of everything (TOE) rather than a Grand Unified Theory. Thus, GUTs are often seen as an intermediate step towards a TOE.

The novel particles predicted by GUT models are expected to have extremely high masses—around the GUT scale of  GeV (just three orders of magnitude below the Planck scale of  GeV)—and so are well beyond the reach of any foreseen particle hadron collider experiments. Therefore, the particles predicted by GUT models will be unable to be observed directly, and instead the effects of grand unification might be detected through indirect observations such as proton decay, electric dipole moments of elementary particles, or the properties of neutrinos. Some GUTs, such as the Pati–Salam model, predict the existence of magnetic monopoles.

While GUTs might be expected to offer simplicity over the complications present in the Standard Model, realistic models remain complicated because they need to introduce additional fields and interactions, or even additional dimensions of space, in order to reproduce observed fermion masses and mixing angles. This difficulty, in turn, may be related to an existence of family symmetries beyond the conventional GUT models. Due to this, and the lack of any observed effect of grand unification so far, there is no generally accepted GUT model.

Models that do not unify the three interactions using one simple group as the gauge symmetry, but do so using semisimple groups, can exhibit similar properties and are sometimes referred to as Grand Unified Theories as well.

History
Historically, the first true GUT which was based on the simple Lie group , was proposed by Howard Georgi and Sheldon Glashow in 1974. The Georgi–Glashow model was preceded by the semisimple Lie algebra Pati–Salam model by Abdus Salam and Jogesh Pati also in 1974, who pioneered the idea to unify gauge interactions.

The acronym GUT was first coined in 1978 by CERN researchers John Ellis, Andrzej Buras, Mary K. Gaillard, and Dimitri Nanopoulos, however in the final version of their paper they opted for the less anatomical GUM (Grand Unification Mass). Nanopoulos later that year was the first to use the acronym in a paper.

Motivation
The supposition that the electric charges of electrons and protons seem to cancel each other exactly to extreme precision is essential for the existence of the macroscopic world as we know it, but this important property of elementary particles is not explained in the Standard Model of particle physics. The observed charge quantization, namely the postulation that all known elementary particles carry electric charges which are exact multiples of one-third of the "elementary" charge, has led to the idea that hypercharge interactions and possibly the strong and weak interactions might be embedded in one Grand Unified interaction described by a single, larger simple symmetry group containing the Standard Model. This would automatically predict the quantized nature and values of all elementary particle charges. Since this also results in a prediction for the relative strengths of the fundamental interactions which we observe, in particular, the weak mixing angle, grand unification ideally reduces the number of independent input parameters but is also constrained by observations.

Grand unification is reminiscent of the unification of electric and magnetic forces by Maxwell's field theory of electromagnetism in the 19th century, but its physical implications and mathematical structure are qualitatively different.

Unification of matter particles

SU(5)

 is the simplest GUT. The smallest simple Lie group which contains the standard model, and upon which the first Grand Unified Theory was based, is

.

Such group symmetries allow the reinterpretation of several known particles, including the photon, W and Z bosons, and gluon, as different states of a single particle field. However, it is not obvious that the simplest possible choices for the extended "Grand Unified" symmetry should yield the correct inventory of elementary particles.

In the standard assignment, the  contains the charge conjugates of the right-handed down-type quark color triplet and a left-handed lepton isospin doublet, while the  contains the six up-type quark components, the left-handed down-type quark color triplet, and the right-handed electron. This scheme has to be replicated for each of the three known generations of matter. It is notable that the theory is anomaly free with this matter content.

(see seesaw mechanism).

SO(10)

The next simple Lie group which contains the standard model is

.

This is already the largest simple group that achieves the unification of matter in a scheme involving only the already known matter particles (apart from the Higgs sector).

Some of these mass relations hold approximately, but most don't (see Georgi-Jarlskog mass relation).

The bosons are found by adding a partner to each of the 20 charged bosons (2 right-handed W bosons, 6 massive charged gluons and 12 X/Y type bosons) and adding an extra heavy neutral Z-boson to make 5 neutral bosons in total. The boson matrix will have a boson or its new partner in each row and column.

E6

In some forms of string theory, including E8 × E8 heterotic string theory, the resultant four-dimensional theory after spontaneous compactification on a six-dimensional Calabi–Yau manifold resembles a GUT based on the group E6. Notably E6 is the only exceptional simple Lie group to have any complex representations, a requirement for a theory to contain chiral fermions (namely all weakly-interacting fermions). Hence the other four (G2, F4, E7, and E8) can't be the gauge group of a GUT.

Extended Grand Unified Theories
Non-chiral extensions of the Standard Model with vectorlike split-multiplet particle spectra which naturally appear in the higher SU(N) GUTs considerably modify the desert physics and lead to the realistic (string-scale) grand unification for conventional three quark-lepton families even without using supersymmetry (see below). On the other hand, due to a new missing VEV mechanism emerging in the supersymmetric SU(8) GUT the simultaneous solution to the gauge hierarchy (doublet-triplet splitting) problem and problem of unification of flavor can be argued.

GUTs with four families / generations, SU(8): Assuming 4 generations of fermions instead of 3 makes a total of  types of particles. This can be divided into  which is the  theory together with some heavy bosons which act on the generation number.

Symplectic groups and quaternion representations
Symplectic gauge groups could also be considered. For example,  (which is called  in the article symplectic group) has a representation in terms of  quaternion unitary matrices which has a  dimensional real representation and so might be considered as a candidate for a gauge group.  has 32 charged bosons and 4 neutral bosons. Although it's probably not possible to have weak bosons acting on chiral fermions in this representation. A quaternion representation of the fermions might be:

A further complication with quaternion representations of fermions is that there are two types of multiplication: left multiplication and right multiplication which must be taken into account. It turns out that including left and right-handed  quaternion matrices is equivalent to including a single right-multiplication by a unit quaternion which adds an extra SU(2) and so has an extra neutral boson and two more charged bosons.

Octonion representations
It can be noted that a generation of 16 fermions can be put into the form of an octonion with each element of the octonion being an 8-vector. If the 3 generations are then put in a 3x3 hermitian matrix with certain additions for the diagonal elements then these matrices form an exceptional (Grassmann) Jordan algebra, which has the symmetry group of one of the exceptional Lie groups (F4, E6, E7 or E8) depending on the details.

Because they are fermions the anti-commutators of the Jordan algebra become commutators. It is known that E6 has subgroup  and so is big enough to include the Standard Model. An E8 gauge group, for example, would have 8 neutral bosons, 120 charged bosons and 120 charged anti-bosons. To account for the 248 fermions in the lowest multiplet of E8, these would either have to include anti-particles (and so have baryogenesis), have new undiscovered particles, or have gravity-like (spin connection) bosons affecting elements of the particles spin direction. Each of these possesses theoretical problems.

Beyond Lie groups
Other structures have been suggested including Lie 3-algebras and Lie superalgebras. Neither of these fit with Yang–Mills theory. In particular Lie superalgebras would introduce bosons with incorrect statistics. Supersymmetry, however, does fit with Yang–Mills.

Unification of forces and the role of supersymmetry
The unification of forces is possible due to the energy scale dependence of force coupling parameters in quantum field theory called renormalization group "running", which allows parameters with vastly different values at usual energies to converge to a single value at a much higher energy scale.

This is a significant result, as other Lie groups lead to different normalizations. However, if the supersymmetric extension MSSM is used instead of the Standard Model, the match becomes much more accurate. In this case, the coupling constants of the strong and electroweak interactions meet at the grand unification energy, also known as the GUT scale:

.

It is commonly believed that this matching is unlikely to be a coincidence, and is often quoted as one of the main motivations to further investigate supersymmetric theories despite the fact that no supersymmetric partner particles have been experimentally observed. Also, most model builders simply assume supersymmetry because it solves the hierarchy problem—i.e., it stabilizes the electroweak Higgs mass against radiative corrections.

Neutrino masses
Since Majorana masses of the right-handed neutrino are forbidden by  symmetry,  GUTs predict the Majorana masses of right-handed neutrinos to be close to the GUT scale where the symmetry is spontaneously broken in those models. In supersymmetric GUTs, this scale tends to be larger than would be desirable to obtain realistic masses of the light, mostly left-handed neutrinos (see neutrino oscillation) via the seesaw mechanism. These predictions are independent of the Georgi–Jarlskog mass relations, wherein some GUTs predict other fermion mass ratios.

Proposed theories
Several theories have been proposed, but none is currently universally accepted. An even more ambitious theory that includes all fundamental forces, including gravitation, is termed a theory of everything. Some common mainstream GUT models are:

 Pati–Salam model — 
 Georgi–Glashow model — ; and Flipped  — 
 SO(10) model; and Flipped  — 
 E6 model; and Trinification — 
 minimal left-right model — 
 331 model — 
 chiral color

Not quite GUTs:

 Technicolor models
 Little Higgs
 String theory
 Causal fermion systems

 M-theory
 Preons
 Loop quantum gravity
  Causal dynamical triangulation theory

Note: These models refer to Lie algebras not to Lie groups. The Lie group could be , just to take a random example.

(Minimal)  does not contain any exotic fermions (i.e. additional fermions besides the Standard Model fermions and the right-handed neutrino), and it unifies each generation into a single irreducible representation. They are the minimal left-right model, flipped  and the Pati–Salam model. The GUT group E6 contains , but models based upon it are significantly more complicated. The primary reason for studying E6 models comes from  heterotic string theory.

GUT models generically predict the existence of topological defects such as monopoles, cosmic strings, domain walls, and others. But none have been observed. Their absence is known as the monopole problem in cosmology. Many GUT models also predict proton decay, although not the Pati–Salam model. As of now, proton decay has never been experimentally observed. The minimal experimental limit on the proton's lifetime pretty much rules out minimal  and heavily constrains the other models. The lack of detected supersymmetry to date also constrains many models.

Some GUT theories like  and  suffer from what is called the doublet-triplet problem. These theories predict that for each electroweak Higgs doublet, there is a corresponding colored Higgs triplet field with a very small mass (many orders of magnitude smaller than the GUT scale here). In theory, unifying quarks with leptons, the Higgs doublet would also be unified with a Higgs triplet. Such triplets have not been observed. They would also cause extremely rapid proton decay (far below current experimental limits) and prevent the gauge coupling strengths from running together in the renormalization group.

Most GUT models require a threefold replication of the matter fields. As such, they do not explain why there are three generations of fermions. Most GUT models also fail to explain the little hierarchy between the fermion masses for different generations.

Ingredients
A GUT model consists of a gauge group which is a compact Lie group, a connection form for that Lie group, a Yang–Mills action for that connection given by an invariant symmetric bilinear form over its Lie algebra (which is specified by a coupling constant for each factor), a Higgs sector consisting of a number of scalar fields taking on values within real/complex representations of the Lie group and chiral Weyl fermions taking on values within a complex rep of the Lie group. The Lie group contains the Standard Model group and the Higgs fields acquire VEVs leading to a spontaneous symmetry breaking to the Standard Model. The Weyl fermions represent matter.

Current status
There is currently no hard evidence that nature is described by a Grand Unified Theory. One of the few possible experimental tests of certain GUT is proton decay and also fermion masses. There are a few more special tests for supersymmetric GUT. However, minimum proton lifetimes from research (at or exceeding the 1034-1035 year range) have ruled out simpler GUTs and most non-SUSY models. The maximum upper limit on proton lifetime (if unstable), is calculated at 6 x 1039 years for SUSY models and 1.4 x 1036 years for minimal non-SUSY GUTs.

The gauge coupling strengths of QCD, the weak interaction and hypercharge seem to meet at a common length scale called the GUT scale and equal approximately to 1016 GeV (slightly less than the Planck energy of 1019 GeV), which is somewhat suggestive. This interesting numerical observation is called the gauge coupling unification, and it works particularly well if one assumes the existence of superpartners of the Standard Model particles. Still it is possible to achieve the same by postulating, for instance, that ordinary (non supersymmetric)  models break with an intermediate gauge scale, such as the one of Pati–Salam group.

Ultra unification 

In 2020, a proposed theory called "ultra unification"
would combine the Standard Model and grand unification, particularly for the models with 15 Weyl fermions per generation, without the necessity of right-handed sterile neutrinos by adding new gapped topological phase sectors consistent with the nonperturbative global anomaly cancellation and cobordism constraints (especially from the baryon minus lepton number B−L, the electroweak hypercharge Y, and the mixed gauge-gravitational anomaly such as a Z/16Z class anomaly). Gapped topological phase sectors are constructed via symmetry extension, whose low energy contains unitary Lorentz invariant topological quantum field theories (TQFTs), such as four dimensional noninvertible, five dimensional noninvertible, or five dimensional invertible entangled gapped phase TQFTs. Alternatively, there could also be right-handed sterile neutrinos, gapless unparticle physics, or some combination of more general interacting conformal field theories, to cancel the mixed gauge-gravitational anomaly. In either case, this implies a new high-energy physics frontier beyond the conventional zero dimensional particle physics that relies on new types of topological forces and matter, including gapped extended objects such as line and surface operators or conformal defects, whose open ends carry deconfined fractionalized particle or anyonic string excitations. A physical characterization of these gapped extended objects require extensions of mathematical concepts such as cohomology, cobordism, or categories into particle physics.

See also
B − L quantum number
Classical unified field theories
Paradigm shift
Physics beyond the Standard Model
Theory of everything
X and Y bosons

Notes

References

Further reading
Stephen Hawking, A Brief History of Time, includes a brief popular overview.

External links
The Algebra of Grand Unified Theories

 
Particle physics
Physical cosmology
Physics beyond the Standard Model